Daniel "Dani" Lorenzo Guerrero (born 5 April 2003) is a Spanish footballer who plays as an attacking midfielder for Mérida AD on loan from Málaga CF.

Club career
Born in Marbella, Málaga, Andalusia, Lorenzo joined Real Madrid's La Fábrica in 2017 from Málaga CF. On 20 July 2021, he returned to Málaga and was assigned to the reserves in the Tercera División RFEF.

Lorenzo made his senior debut on 19 September 2021, starting with the B's in a 1–1 home draw against UD Torre del Mar. He scored his first goal on 12 October, netting the opener in home draw against CD Alhaurino, for the same scoreline.

Lorenzo made his first-team debut on 2 December 2021, coming on as a second-half substitute for fellow youth graduate Haitam Abaida in a 3–0 away win over Peña Sport FC in the season's Copa del Rey. He made his professional debut three days later, replacing Mathieu Peybernes in a 1–2 home loss against SD Amorebieta in the Segunda División.

On 19 January 2023, Lorenzo renewed his contract until 2025, and was loaned to Primera Federación side Mérida AD for the remainder of the season.

References

External links
Real Madrid profile
Málaga CF profile

2003 births
Living people
People from Marbella
Sportspeople from the Province of Málaga
Spanish footballers
Footballers from Andalusia
Association football midfielders
Segunda División players
Tercera Federación players
Atlético Malagueño players
Málaga CF players
Mérida AD players